Günter Wienhold (21 January 1948 – 21 September 2021) was a German footballer who played as a goalkeeper. He competed in the men's tournament at the 1972 Summer Olympics. He died on 21 September 2021, at the age of 73.

References

External links
 

1948 births
2021 deaths
Footballers from Duisburg
German footballers
Association football goalkeepers
Eintracht Frankfurt players
SC Freiburg players
Bundesliga players
2. Bundesliga players
Olympic footballers of West Germany
West German footballers
Footballers at the 1972 Summer Olympics